A referendum on membership of the European Union and NATO was held in Slovenia on 23 March 2003. Voters were asked two questions;
Do you agree to the proposal that the Republic of Slovenia should become a member of the European Union?
Do you agree to the proposal that the Republic of Slovenia should become a member of the North Atlantic Treaty Organization (NATO)?

Both questions received a majority in favor, with 89.61% voting for EU membership and 66.02% for NATO membership. Voter turnout was 60.23%.

Results

Question 1

Question 2

References

External links
 EU and NATO Referendum, State Election Commission of Slovenia (in Slovene)

2003 referendums
European Union and NATO membership referendum, 2003
European Union and NATO membership referendum, 2003
Referendums related to European Union accession
European Union and NATO membership referendum, 2003
Membership referendum
NATO membership referendums
March 2003 events in Europe